Diving was contested at the 1954 Asian Games in Manila, Philippines from May 5 to May 8, 1954.

Medalists

Men

Women

Medal table

References 

 The Straits Times, May 6–11, 1954

External links
Medals

 
1954 Asian Games events
1954
Asian Games
1954 Asian Games